Lee Sang-deuk (born November 29, 1935) is a South Korean politician and businessman. He is well known as the older brother of the former South Korean president, Lee Myung-bak. He was a member of the conservative Saenuri Party in the National Assembly. He was convicted of bribery in 2013, and is currently serving a one-year prison sentence.

Controversies
He is alleged to be the ringleader of the illegal political-level investigation towards civilian institutions and individuals by the ruling party, the Grand National Party.
During the controversial passing of the year 2011 budget bill, he is alleged to obtain an unusually enormous funding for his representative area, Pohang. Political critics call this act a capitalization of "big brother" budget due to his close kinship ties with Lee Myung-bak. Democratic Party assembly leader, Park Ji-weon, criticized this act as contributing to the unbalanced and unfair budget distribution all across South Korea.
He was criticized for making a jingoistic suggestion about marking the Taegeuk symbol on the food supplies for the 2011 Tōhoku earthquake and tsunami victims.
He possessed a piece of land in secret between 1995 and 2003 under secret deal with Samho, a Korean company, and the National Intelligence Service.

Allegations of bribery
A personal aide of Lee Sang-deuk was arrested for receiving briberies that involved Lee Kuk-chul, chairman of the shipbuilding company, SLS Group.
Lee later declared that the 700 million won in secretary's bank account is officially under his ownership.

See also
 Lee Myung-bak

References

External links
  Lee Sang-deuk's Homepage

Lee Myung-bak
People from North Gyeongsang Province
Living people
1935 births
Members of the National Assembly (South Korea)
Deputy Speakers of the National Assembly (South Korea)